Kis or KIS may refer to:

Places 
 Kiş, Khojavend, Azerbaijan
 Kiş, Shaki, Azerbaijan
 Kish (Sumer) (Sumerian: Kiš), an ancient city in Sumer
 Kis, Babol Kenar, a village in Mazandaran Province, Iran
 Kis, Bandpey-ye Gharbi, a village in Mazandaran Province, Iran
 Kis, Bandpey-ye Sharqi, a village in Mazandaran Province, Iran

Schools 
KIS International School, Bangkok, Thailand
Kazakhstan International School, Almaty, Kazakhstan
Kodaikanal International School, Kodaikanal, Tamil Nadu, India
Korean International School in Shenzhen

Transport 
 Kin Sang stop, Hong Kong, MTR station code
 Kissimmee (Amtrak station), Florida, USA, Amtrak code
 Kisumu Airport (IATA: KIS), Kenya

Other
 Kis (surname)
 KIS (weapon), a Polish World War II machine pistol
 Cusae, a city in Upper Egypt
 Kis FM, an Indonesian radio station
 Kis language, spoken in Papua New Guinea
 Kaspersky Internet Security
 Knowbot Information Service
 Köpings IS, a Swedish sports club
 Kosovo Is Serbia, a movement promoting that Kosovo is part of Serbia
 Keep It Simple, an alternate form of the KISS principle
 -kis-, from the Greek word, meaning "times", forming a Greek multiple numerical prefix

See also 
 Kiss (disambiguation)